Soeng Sang is a district (amphoe) in the southeastern part of Nakhon Ratchasima province, northeastern Thailand.

Etymology
The meaning of the district name in Thai is 'dawn' or 'nearly dawn'. The city temple is called Wat Thung Rung Arun Si Soeng Sang.

History
The area was separated from Khon Buri district and became a minor district (king amphoe) on 7 May 1976. The minor district originally consisted of a single tambon, Sa Takhian. It was upgraded to a full district on 25 March 1979.

Geography
Neighbouring districts are (from the north clockwise): Nong Ki, Non Suwan, Pakham, and Non Din Daeng of Buriram province; Watthana Nakhon of Sa Kaeo province; and Khon Buri of Nakhon Ratchasima Province.

One of the main attractions in Soeng Sang is the Chomtawan Reservoir.

Administration
The district is divided into six sub-districts (tambons), which are further subdivided into 84 villages (mubans). There are two townships (thesaban tambons), Soeng Sang and Non Sombun, both covering part of same-named tambon. Each of the sub-districts has a tambon administrative organization, responsible for the area not covered by the townships.

References

External links
amphoe.com

Soeng Sang